Michael Robin Ovington (11 January 194511 June 2006) was an Australian public servant, diplomat, linguist and translator.

Ovington was Australian Consul to Nouméa from 1978 to 1980. From 1980 to 1983 he was Australia's first High Commissioner to Vanuatu

References

1945 births
2006 deaths
Consuls-General of Australia in Noumea
High Commissioners of Australia to Vanuatu
University of Sydney alumni